Egg Island Lighthouse is a lighthouse on Egg Island.

See also 
 List of lighthouses in the Bahamas

References

External links 
 Picture of Egg Island Lighthouse

Lighthouses in the Bahamas